This is a list of notable pigs.

General

Arnold
Arnold was the Ziffels' pet pig on the TV sitcom Green Acres. He would perform anthropomorphic activities such as coming uninvited into the Douglas home, turning on the television and watching while sitting in a chair.

Khanzir

Khanzir is a male pig who, in May 2009, attracted international attention as the "only pig in Afghanistan".

King Neptune

At least two monuments have been erected in honor of this pig and his handlers.

Learned pig

In 1784-85 an unnamed pig was exhibited in London under the title The Learned Pig. The pig was said to be able to spell words and solve arithmetical problems. Later Learned Pigs were exhibited under the name Toby, and were said to be able to read minds.

Maude
Maude was a pet owned by U.S. President Theodore Roosevelt and his family during his presidency (1901–1909).

Max

Max was the Vietnamese potbellied pig pet of George Clooney, often referred to as "Max the star" by Clooney. The pig shared Clooney's Hollywood Hills home, also Clooney's bed, and frequently made cameos in interviews, mostly because of his size. Max died in 2006.

Pigasus

Pigasus was a tongue-in-cheek candidate for President of the United States run by the Yippies at the 1968 Democratic National Convention in Chicago.

Snobben
Snobben was a Norwegian pet pig that received national attention when the owner's car was stolen in 2001, with the pet pig inside. The car was found five days later, with the pig in good shape. At the time Snobben was already known locally in Oslo, where he during the late 1990s was often seen doing the groceries alone at Majorstuen.

The Tamworth Two

The Tamworth Two, named Butch Cassidy and the Sundance Pig, were two Tamworth Ginger pigs who escaped while being unloaded from a lorry at an abattoir in the English town of Malmesbury, Wiltshire in January 1998. The pigs were on the run for over a week, and the search for them caused a huge media sensation, as well as immense public interest, both in Britain and abroad.

Thunder and Bolt 

Thunder and Bolt are a pair of certified therapy animals, raised by a 10-year-old girl, who have garnered national attention in the US for visiting hospitals and nursing homes.

Tirpitz

Tirpitz was a pig captured from the German Navy after a naval skirmish following the Battle of the Falkland Islands in 1914. He subsequently became the mascot of the cruiser HMS Glasgow.

Unnamed pig
In 1859, an unnamed British-owned pig wandered into Lyman Cutlar's potato patch on San Juan Island, 
Washington, and was shot, thus setting off a (small) cold war known as the Pig War.

Large pigs

This is a list of pigs that are notable for their abnormally large size.

Curly Boy
In March 1901, an article appeared in the Rushville, Illinois newspaper, the Rushville Times, telling of the slaughter of a 1,255 pound hog. This article was later printed in the Schuyler County, Illinois historical newsletter The Schuylerite 14:1 (Spring 1985):  
"Curly Boy Slaughtered
The above caption may appear misleading and cause the TIMES readers to think there has been a slaughter of a tow-headed boy, but it was meant to tell of the death of Samuel A. Stephen's big hog in Chicago. Mr. Stephens shipped the 1,255 pound porker from here last week and he reached Chicago safely. All along the way, whenever the train stopped, there gathered a crowd of persons to see the hog. At the Union Stock Yards in Chicago he attracted not a little attention and drew a crowd like a monkey show in the country. At the packing house where he was killed, the foreman ordered the butchers to hang him up on cattle chains, as the regular hog chains were not made for such as he. His skin was carefully removed and was turned over to a taxidermist, who will cure it and mount the animal in a life size position."

Monster Pig

Monster Pig is the name of a large hog killed on May 3, 2007, by an eleven-year-old boy, Jamison Stone in a  low fence enclosure within the larger  commercial hunting preserve called Lost Creek Plantation, outside Anniston, Alabama. Claims of the authenticity and allegations of the kill being a canned hunt have disputed the claim. Shortly after the story and allegations broke the origin of the hog was traced back to a local farm who had originally named the animal "Fred."

Hogzilla

Hogzilla is the name given to a wild hog that was shot and killed in Alapaha, Georgia, on June 17, 2004, by Chris Griffin on Ken Holyoak's farm and hunting reserve.

Coursey hog

On January 5, 2007, a  feral hog was shot in Fayetteville, Georgia. The shooter was William "Bill" Coursey, who hung the specimen from a tree in his yard. Neighbours reported that the animal had been seen in the neighborhood several times over the preceding days. A spokesperson from the Georgia Department of Natural Resources said that large boars and feral hogs were common in southern Georgia, but that no records are kept on them. The media latched on to the notion that this animal rivals the size of Hogzilla.

Hog Kong
Hog Kong was an estimated  wild hog killed in August 2004 by Larry Earley at his  farm near Leesburg, Florida, using a Smith & Wesson Model 29.

Big Bill
The world record for the heaviest pig so far is held by Big Bill, owned by Elias Buford Butler of Jackson, Tennessee. Bill was due to be exhibited at the Chicago World Fair when he broke a leg and had to be put down. At about this point in time, the trend in hog production began to shift to hogs that were much trimmer and very lean.

Ton Pig

Ton died from lack of mobility because of obesity on February 4, 2004. It was sent to the Liaoning Agriculture Museum in Shenyang, for display.

Big Norm
Big Norm was owned by Robert Peterson of Hamilton, New York. Big Norm died of apparent heart failure in 2008.

See also
 List of fictional pigs
 List of pig breeds

References

 
Pigs
Pigs
.